Ambient Compendium is a compilation album by American composer Bill Laswell, released on August 27, 1996, by M.I.L. Multimedia.

Track listing

Personnel 
Bill Laswell – bass guitar, producer

Release history

References

External links 
 Ambient Compendium at Discogs (list of releases)

1996 compilation albums
Bill Laswell compilation albums
Albums produced by Bill Laswell